Ades may refer to:

 Ades (surname)
 AdeS, a brand of drinking water
 Ades Synagogue, a synagogue in Jerusalem
 AdES, an Advanced Electronic Signature
 Soft drinks (a collective term for lemonade, cherryade, orangeade, etc.)

See also
 Ade (disambiguation)
 Hades (disambiguation)